Ronald Waldron may refer to:

 Ron Waldron (born 1933), Welsh rugby coach
 Ronald Alan Waldron (born 1927), English medievalist